A leadership election for ANO 2011 was held on 17 February 2019. Incumbent Andrej Babiš was the only candidate. He won another term when he received 206 votes of 238.

Background
Andrej Babiš announced on 29 November 2018 that he will seek another term as the leader of ANO 2011. Babiš confirmed his candidacy on 2 January 2019.

References

ANO 2011 leadership elections
2019 elections in the Czech Republic
Single-candidate elections
Indirect elections
Elections in Prague
ANO 2011 leadership election
February 2019  events in the Czech Republic